NLRB v Erie Resistor Corp 373 US 221 (1963) is a US labor law case, concerning the right to organize.

Facts
Employees who crossed a picket line to work were given 20 years of extra seniority by Erie Resistor Corp. The National Labor Relations Board found this constituted an unfair labor practice. The corporation appealed.

Judgment
The Supreme Court held this was an unfair labor practice. In doing so, the Supreme Court disagreed with the Court of Appeals and noted that a legitimate business purpose is not always a defense to an unfair labor practice charge. The Supreme Court concluded that the "super-seniority" policy instituted by Erie Resistor "by its very terms operates to discriminate between strikers and non-strikers, both during and after a strike, and its destructive impact upon the strike and union activity cannot be doubted." As such, the Supreme Court upheld the Board's determination that this was an 8(a)(3) violation of the NLRA.

See also

US labor law

Notes

References

United States labor case law